Ntesang Simanyana (born 12 February 1990) is a Motswana footballer playing for the Botswana national football team.

Honours

Club
 Gaborone United
Mascom Top 8 Cup:1
2014-15

 Township Rollers
Botswana Premier League:3
2016-17, 2017-18, 2018-19
Mascom Top 8 Cup:2
2011-12, 2017-18

Individual
Mascom Top 8 Cup Player of the Tournament: 2012

References

External links

1990 births
Gaborone United S.C. players
Township Rollers F.C. players
Polokwane City F.C. players
Living people
Botswana footballers
Botswana expatriate footballers
Botswana international footballers
Expatriate soccer players in South Africa
Association football midfielders